Olivet is a commune in the Loiret department in north-central France.

Geography
Olivet is located in the northern bend of the Loire, which crosses from east to west. Olivet belongs to the Loire Valley sector between Sully-sur-Loire and Chalonnes-sur-Loire, which was in 2000 inscribed by UNESCO as a World Heritage Site.

Olivet is 120 km south-south-west of Paris. Olivet is bordered to the north by Orléans and to the south by the Sologne.

Olivet is crossed by the Loiret, a 13 km long river which is both a tributary and a resurgence of the Loire.

History
The first traces of inhabitants belong to the Merovingian era. The water mills along the river were built by monks during the tenth century.

The first name of the village, during the eleventh century, was Saint Martin du Loiret. The name Olivet comes probably from Mount of olives.

The village suffered severe destructions during the Hundred Years' War, especially during the Siege of Orléans.

During the nineteenth century the river sides became a resort. Most of the surface was still devoted to agriculture, specialised in flowers, vegetable and fruits.

Nowadays Olivet is a growing city of more than 20,000 inhabitants.

Population

Places of interest

The peaceful river Loiret, surrounded by trees and home of numerous swans, offers pleasant public walks. They show glimpses of water mills, old castles, guinguettes and boat garages.

On the north side of the main bridge, the Horloge fleurie is a giant clock on a flowery slope.

The Eglise Saint Martin is a historical monument whose building began in the thirteenth century.

Gastronomy
 Olivet, a cheese often covered with ashes, hay or plane leaves
 poire d'Olivet, a pear liquor with a whole pear inside the bottle

People
 Gentien Hervet (1499–1584), writer and translator
 Gaston d'Illiers (1876–1932), sculptor
 Louis d'Illiers (1880–1953), writer
 Jules-Marie Simon (1871–1970), writer
 Isidore Bernhart (1898–1976), pataphysician
 Pierre Michon (1945- ), writer

See also
 Communes of the Loiret department

References

External links

 (French) Official city website

Communes of Loiret